Antonio Franco Florensa (25 October 1911 – 30 June 1996) was a Spanish professional football player and manager associated with Espanyol, FC Barcelona and Lleida.

External links

1911 births
1996 deaths
Spanish footballers
FC Barcelona players
RCD Espanyol footballers
Spanish football managers
UE Lleida managers
La Liga players
Catalonia international footballers
Footballers from Catalonia
Sportspeople from Lleida
Association football midfielders